Magadan Nature Reserve (also Magadansky) is a Russian zapovednik (strict nature reserve) located in four different sectors across the Magadan region of the Russian Far East, including the northern shore of the Sea of Okhotsk.  All sites are far away from each other, have different climates, topography, flora and fauna, and no settlements or transportation routes.  On the streams of the territory are some of the largest undisturbed spawning sites of the chum and coho salmon. One area, the Yam Islands, is home to colonies of sea birds, with a total of up to 6 million individuals.  These include Auklets-crumbs, guillemot, spectacled guillemots, lund, and the horned puffin.  The reserve is situated in the Olsky District of Magadan Oblast. Recently, the reserve has experimented with very limited cruise ship visits (under 200 passengers) to one of the islands, and plans are being studied for ways to increase educational eco-tourism in the highly inaccessible area.

Topography 
The largest sector, Kava-Chyolomdzha, is in the southwest corner of Magadan Oblast.  It is separated from the Okhotsk Sea by the Kava-Taui regional nature reserve. The second largest sector is the Seymchan (Kolyma) section located inland by the right bank of the Kolyma River,  from the city of Magadan.  The third largest sector is the Ola area on the Koni Peninsula that extends into the Okhotsk Sea.  The fourth sector is the Yama section, in the southwest of the region, and itself is divided into coastal, floodplain, and island subsections.

Climate and ecoregion
Magadan is located in the Cherskii-Kolyma mountain tundra ecoregion.  This ecoregion covers the mountainous areas of northeast Siberia.  It is an ecoregion of extreme cold and extreme aridity.

The climate of Magadan is Subarctic climate, without dry season (Köppen climate classification Subarctic climate (Dfc)). This climate is characterized by mild summers (only 1-3 months above ) and cold, snowy winters (coldest month below ).

Flora and fauna 
More than half of the reserve territory is coniferous forest, mostly larch (Larix gmelinii).  The second most common tree species is the Creeping cedar.  Among mammals, the common species are the bank voles, chipmunks, pika, hare, brown bear, fox, sable, ermine, and mink.

Ecotourism
As a strict nature reserve, the Magadan Reserve is mostly closed to the general public, although scientists and those with 'environmental education' purposes can make arrangements with park management for visits.   The reserve does, however, make available to the public the ability to go on eco-tourist excursions on the site, but public visitors must join a group led by a reserve ranger, and must obtain written permits in advance.  There is a public visitor's center with nature exhibits at the reserves main office in the city of Magadan.

See also 
 List of Russian Nature Reserves (class 1a 'zapovedniks')

References

External links
  Map of Magadansky Reserve, OpenStreetMap
  Map of Magadansky Reserve, ProtectedPlanet

Nature reserves in Russia
Protected areas established in 1982
1982 establishments in Russia
Geography of Magadan Oblast
Protected areas of the Russian Far East
Zapovednik